The Ananias Club was a euphemism used by American press in 1906–07 during the administration of President Theodore Roosevelt, to refer to public figures that the President accused of dishonesty. The press employed the euphemism to avoid printing the word "liar."

Origins
The first recorded use of the word was employed by the press in 1906 to avoid the "short and ugly word" (liar) in connection with the "mutual accusations of inveracity" which arose between President Theodore Roosevelt and Senator Benjamin Tillman of South Carolina over the railroad rate bill. The phrase was adopted to describe any person President Roosevelt accused of dishonesty. The name derived from the story of Ananias, who fell dead when he lied to the apostle Peter about a financial transaction.

Members

so-called "nature fakers"
Congressman Butler Ames
banker Wharton Barker
industrialist Henry Melville Whitney

Later uses
Franklin D. Roosevelt used the expression "Ananias Club" in his first press conference as President of the United States in reference to his policy on the use of background material provided by the White House:
Then there are two other matters we will talk about: The first is "background information", which means material which can be used by all of you on your own authority and responsibility, not to be attributed to the White House, because I do not want to have to revive the Ananias Club.

References

External links
The American Presidency Project

Theodore Roosevelt